Neve Jones (born 26 December 1998) is an Irish rugby player from Ballymena. She plays for Gloucester-Hartpury, Ulster and the Ireland women's national rugby union team.

Club career 
Jones started playing rugby, age 6, through mini rugby in her local club Ballymena RFC. There was no girls' rugby in her schools  Cambridge House Grammar School and Ballymena Academy. Neve's attempts to launch it at both schools were rejected by the schools so she joined Malone RFC when she was 14.

She captained the Ulster U18s to the first Irish U18 Provincial trophy in 2016.

Jones was Malone's top try-scorer in 2019 and the winner of the 2020 Energia Women's All Ireland League Rising Star Award.Ulster under 18 player of the year.

On 7 January 2022 Gloucester-Hartpury announced that they'd signed Jones to their squad.

International career 
Jones first got selected to the Ireland women's national rugby union team in 2020, making her the first female international player to represent Malone RFC.

She made her debut, as a replacement versus Italy, in the 2020 Women's Six Nations.

In the 2021 Women's Six Nations she played, as a replacement, versus Wales.

Personal life 
Jones is studying sports coaching at the University of Ulster in Jordanstown.

Before she played rugby she was involved in swimming, netball and jiu jitsu. She took up ladies gaelic football in 2020 and plays for East Belfast GFC, the first GAA team to be set up there in nearly 50 years.

Honours 
 2020 Energia Women's All Ireland League Rising Star Award

References

External links 
 https://www.irishrugby.ie/women/neve-jones/

1998 births
Living people
Irish female rugby union players
Rugby union hookers